Spirama griseisigma is a moth of the family Erebidae. It is found in Africa, including Zimbabwe.

References

Moths described in 1913
Spirama